Heart to Heart is a 1928 American silent comedy film directed by William Beaudine and produced and distributed by the First National company. The film is preserved in the Library of Congress  collection, Packard Campus

Cast
 Mary Astor as Princess Delatorre / Ellen Guthrie
 Lloyd Hughes as Philip Lennox
 Louise Fazenda as Aunt Katie Boyd
 Lucien Littlefield as Uncle Joe Boyd
 Thelma Todd as Ruby Boyd
 Raymond McKee as Milt D'Arcy
 Virginia Grey as Hazel Boyd
 Aileen Manning as Aunt Meta

References

External links
 
 

1928 films
1928 comedy films
Silent American comedy films
American silent feature films
American black-and-white films
Films directed by William Beaudine
First National Pictures films
1920s American films